WKGM (940 AM) is a southern gospel formatted broadcast radio station licensed to Smithfield, Virginia, serving Hampton Roads. WKGM is owned and operated by Baker Family Stations.

Translator
In addition to the main station, WKGM is relayed by an FM translator to widen its broadcast area.

References

External links
 WKGM AM 940 Online

1974 establishments in Virginia
Radio stations established in 1974
KGM
Isle of Wight County, Virginia
Southern Gospel radio stations in the United States